The Pecatonica River is a tributary of the Rock River,  long, in southern Wisconsin and northern Illinois in the United States.

The word Pecatonica is an anglicization of two Algonquian language words: Bekaa (or Pekaa in some dialects), which means "slow", and niba, which means "water", forming the conjunction Bekaaniba or "Slow Water".

It flows south, then southeast, past Calamine and Darlington.

Illinois parks and preserves
The Winnebago County Forest Preserve District owns and operates six preserve along the river in Winnebago County. The river is the chief attraction of the  Pecatonica Wetlands Forest Preserve and the  Crooked River Forest Preserve off U.S. Highway 20 near Pecatonica, Illinois.  These forest preserves contain oxbow, wetlands, and bottomland forest. The river also flows past the  Pecatonica River Forest Preserve off Illinois Route 70 near Pecatonica.  The forest preserve contains a bottomland forest and has been designated an Illinois Nature Preserve.  The  Trask Bridge Forest Preserve and the  Two Rivers Forest Preserve at the confluence of the Sugar River and Pecatonica River provide public boat launches, picnic areas, and fishing opportunities. At the mouth of the Pecatonica is the  Macktown Forest Preserve on Illinois Route 75 near Rockton, the site of the ghost town of Macktown or Pe-Katonic.

The Natural Land Institute of Rockford, Illinois owns and operates two privately owned preserves in Winnebago County. The  Pecatonica Woodlands Preserve contains bottomland forest, oxbow pond, wetland, and sedge meadow habitats. The  Nygren Wetland Preserve, located at the confluence of the Pecatonica River and the Rock River, has been restored from farmland to prairie, oak savanna, wetland, and oxbow pond.

Wisconsin parks and preserves
The river is the focus of the  Pecatonica River Woods State Natural Area near Mineral Point in Iowa County, owned by the Wisconsin Department of Natural Resources and designated as a natural area in 1992. The Pecatonica River Woods SNA was listed on the basis of possessing a diverse range of forest ecosystems, from southern dry, through mesic, to floodplain. The  Weir White Oaks State Natural Area, a privately owned preserve managed by the Wisconsin DNR, contains high-quality old growth upland forest and was designated a state natural area in 2002.

The  Blackhawk Memorial Park is owned and operated by Lafayette County.

Flooding 
The Pecatonica River has flooded seven times since May 2017. Flood cleanup cost the city of Freeport, Illinois more than $1.5 million. The March 2019 flood crest of 22.4 feet at Martintown, Wisconsin set a new record. The Pecatonica River flooded again in October 2019, along with other Chicago area rivers including the Fox River and the Rock River.

A USGS monitoring station is located at Freeport.

See also

 List of Illinois rivers
 List of Wisconsin rivers

References

External links

 Macktown Forest Preserve
 Pecatonica River Forest Preserve
 Pecatonica Wetlands Forest Preserve
 Pecatonica River Woods State Natural Area
 Pecatonica River Water Trail (privately maintained website)

Rivers of Illinois
Rivers of Wisconsin
Rivers of Stephenson County, Illinois
Rivers of Winnebago County, Illinois
Rivers of Iowa County, Wisconsin
Rivers of Lafayette County, Wisconsin